The 2014–15 SD Eibar season is the club's 74th overall season and its first in La Liga, the top division of the Spanish football league system.

Squad

First Team Squad
Updated on 25 January 2015.

Transfers

In

Out

Competitions

Overall

La Liga

League table

Results by round

Matches
Kickoff times are in CET.

Squad statistics

Appearances and goals
Updated as of 30 May 2015.

|-
! colspan=14 style=background:#dcdcdc; text-align:center| Players who have made an appearance or had a squad number this season but have been loaned out or transferred

|}

References

External links

SD Eibar seasons
Eibar